Appleby Court is an architecturally notable building at 128 Aldermans Hill, Palmers Green, London. It was built in 1892 by J.B. Franklin in the Richard Norman Shaw Arts and Crafts tradition for his own home but has since been converted to flats. It was originally numbered 127 but that number has now been taken by the adjacent and more recent Willowcroft Lodge.

References

External links 

Buildings and structures completed in 1892
Arts and Crafts architecture in London
Palmers Green